Gradezhnitsa is a village in Teteven Municipality, Lovech Province, northern Bulgaria.

References

Villages in Lovech Province